Güzelhisar Dam is a dam in Izmir Province, Turkey, built between 1975 and 1981. The development was backed by the Turkish State Hydraulic Works.

See also
List of dams and reservoirs in Turkey

References
DSI directory , State Hydraulic Works (Turkey), Retrieved December 16, 2009

Dams in İzmir Province